Evarts is an unincorporated community in central Alberta, Canada within Red Deer County.

History 
The community has the name of Louis P. Evarts, a pioneer citizen. Evarts incorporated as a village on May 9, 1906. It subsequently dissolved from village status on May 27, 1916.

Demographics 

The Dominion Bureau of Statistics recorded Evarts' population as 25 in 1911 and 26 in 1916. According to Alberta Municipal Affairs, the Village of Evarts had a population of 18 in 1914 and 22 in 1915.

See also 
List of communities in Alberta
List of former urban municipalities in Alberta
List of ghost towns in Alberta

References

External links 
Main street, Evarts, Alberta – Glenbow Museum

Former villages in Alberta
Ghost towns in Alberta
Localities in Red Deer County